Zygmunt Żuławski (31 July 1880 in Młynne, Limanowa County, Austria-Hungary – 4 September 1949 in Kraków) was a Polish politician, association activist, and socialist. He was a member of:

 Polska Partia Socjalno-Demokratyczna Galicji i Śląska Cieszyńskiego, since 1904
 Polska Partia Socjalistyczna (Polish Socialist Party), 1919-1939
 Polska Partia Socjalistyczna - Wolność-Równość-Niepodległość, 1940-1945
 Komisja Centralna Związków Zawodowych, 1922-1939
 Odrodzona Polska Partia Socjalistyczna, 1945–1946.

He was a deputy of:

 deputy of a sejm, 1919-1935
 deputy of Krajowa Rada Narodowa (State National Council), 1946-1947
 deputy of Sejm Ustawodawczy, since 1947.

Żuławski published book entitled Wspomnienia (1980).

References
 

1880 births
1949 deaths
People from Limanowa County
People from the Kingdom of Galicia and Lodomeria
Polish Austro-Hungarians
Polish Social Democratic Party of Galicia politicians
Polish Socialist Party politicians
Deputy Marshals of the Sejm of the Second Polish Republic
Members of the Legislative Sejm of the Second Polish Republic
Members of the Sejm of the Second Polish Republic (1922–1927)
Members of the Sejm of the Second Polish Republic (1928–1930)
Members of the Sejm of the Second Polish Republic (1930–1935)
Members of the State National Council
Members of the Polish Sejm 1947–1952
Polish male writers
Austro-Hungarian military personnel of World War I